Sidak (also Romanized as Sīdak) is a village in Baranduz Rural District, in the Central District of Urmia County, West Azerbaijan Province, Iran. At the 2006 census, its population was 198, in 38 families.

References 

Populated places in Urmia County